In mathematics, the Ran space (or Ran's space) of a topological space X is a topological space  whose underlying set is the set of all nonempty finite subsets of X: for a metric space X the topology is induced by the Hausdorff distance. The notion is named after Ziv Ran.

Definition
In general, the topology of the Ran space is generated by sets

 

for any disjoint open subsets .

A theorem of Beilinson and Drinfeld continues to hold:  is acyclic if X is connected.

Properties
A theorem of Beilinson and Drinfeld states that the Ran space of a connected manifold is weakly contractible.

Topological chiral homology 
If F is a cosheaf on the Ran space , then its space of global sections is called the topological chiral homology of M with coefficients in F. If A is, roughly, a family of commutative algebras parametrized by points in M, then there is a factorizable sheaf associated to A. Via this construction, one also obtains the topological chiral homology with coefficients in A. The construction is a generalization of  Hochschild homology.

See also 
Chiral homology

Notes

References 

Topological spaces